Syed Shoaib Ahmed (born 11 July 1996) is an Indian professional footballer who plays as a striker for ARA FC in the I-League 2nd Division.

Career
Ahmed started his career with the youth set-up at Pune F.C. and played for the academy in the I-League U19. He was then promoted to the first-team before the 2014–15 season and made his debut for the side on 31 October 2014 against Churchill Brothers in the Durand Cup. Ahmed started the match and played the whole first half as Pune won 3–0. He then made his professional debut for Pune in the final of the Durand Cup against Salgaocar. He came on as a 19th-minute substitute for Prakash Thorat as Pune lost the final 0–1.

In 2019, Ahmed signed for I-League 2nd Division team, ARA F.C. He made his debut against Hindustan F.C. on 16 January 2019 and scored a hat-trick.

Career statistics

References

External links

1996 births
Living people
Indian footballers
Pune FC players
Association football forwards
ARA FC players
I-League 2nd Division players
I-League players
Gokulam Kerala FC players